State Road 208 (SR 208), locally known as Wilson Boulevard, is a state highway located in Jacksonville, within the northeastern part of the U.S. state of Florida. It begins at Interstate 295 (I-295) and ends at SR 103 (Lane Avenue).

Route description
State Road 208 follows Wilson Boulevard through populated areas.

Major intersections

References

208
208
208
State highways in the United States shorter than one mile